Iselilja is the second album released by the Norwegian folk music band Gåte. The album was released in 2004.

The name Iselilja occurs in the lyrics of the third track of the album, the Norwegian folksong "Knut Liten og Sylvelin".

Track listing
Fredlysning (Astrid Krogh Halse, Sveinung Sundli)
Sjå attende (Traditional, Gåte)
Knut Liten og Sylvelin (Traditional, Gåte)
Du som er ung (Astrid Krogh Halse, Sveinung Sundli)
Jomfruva Ingebjør (Traditional, Gåte)
Sjåaren (Astrid Krogh Halse, Sveinung Sundli)
Rike Rodenigår (Traditional, Gåte)
Ola I (Sveinung Sundli)
Kjærleik (Knut Buen)
Gjendines bånsull (Traditional, Gåte)

Personnel

 Gunnhild Sundli: Vocals
 Magnus Børmark: Guitars
 Sveinung Sundli: Keyboards, Fiddle
 Gjermund Landrø: Bass
 Martin Viktor Langlie: Drums and percussion

Session musicians 

 Sturla Eide: Fiddles
 Daniel Sandén: Key harp and fiddle
 Kåre Christoffer Vestrheim: Keyboards

Producer 
Kåre Christoffer Vestrheim

References 

Gåte: Iselija album cover, Warner Music Norway, 2004

2004 albums
Gåte albums